John Lawson Goodwin (3 June 1887 – 3 November 1954) was a Scottish footballer who played as an inside forward. He was a Scottish Football League champion in each of his first three seasons with Rangers between 1910–11 and 1912–13, also winning the Charity Cup in May 1911 and the Glasgow Cup five months later. He was not a first choice in his position but served as a capable stand-in when either Alec Bennett or Jimmy Bowie was unavailable.

Either side of his spell in Govan he played in his hometown, initially for Ayr Parkhouse then for their successor after a merger, Ayr United, although his final matches in the senior leagues were with their local rivals Kilmarnock – by that point World War I was worsening and it is likely his football career ended due to commitments relating to the conflict.

Goodwin's younger brother Alex also played for Ayr United, joining the club a few months after John moved to Rangers.

Notes and references

1887 births
1954 deaths
Scottish footballers
Footballers from Ayr
Rangers F.C. players
Kilmarnock F.C. players
Ayr United F.C. players
Ayr Parkhouse F.C. players
Scottish Football League players
Scottish Junior Football Association players
Association football inside forwards